The Treaty of Fontainebleau, signed on 23 August (O.S.) / 2 September 1679, ended hostilities between Denmark-Norway and the Swedish Empire in the Scanian War. Denmark, pressured by France, restored all conquests made during the war to Sweden in turn for a "paltry indemnity". The treaty was confirmed, detailed and amended in the subsequent Peace of Lund.

See also
 Louis XIV Victory Monument

References

External links
Scan of the treaty of Fontainebleau (1679) at IEG Mainz

Scanian War
1679 in Denmark
1679 in Sweden
1679 treaties